The Musée des Années Trente (Museum of the 1930s) is a municipal museum specializing in the fine arts, decorative arts, and industrial arts of the 1930s. It is located in the Espace Landowski at 28, Avenue André-Morizet, Boulogne-Billancourt, a western suburb of Paris, France. It is open daily except Mondays and holidays. The closest Paris Métro station is Marcel Sembat on Line 9.

The museum was begun in 1939 by Dr. Albert Besançon. After his death in 1983, the museum focused upon the 1930s, and in 1994 was moved into the Espace Landowski and given its current name. It now provides 3,000 m² of exhibition space.

Today, the museum holds about 1,500 sculptures, 800 paintings, and 20,000 drawings, plus furniture, ceramics, posters, and original records. It also contains a number of African and overseas works from the former Musée national des Arts d'Afrique et d'Océanie, as well as works by architects Le Corbusier, Tony Garnier, André Lurçat, Robert Mallet-Stevens, Auguste Perret, and Jean Prouvé; designers Émile-Jacques Ruhlmann and Jules Leleu; and notable residents including André Malraux.

See also 
 List of museums in Paris

References 
 Les Amis du Musée des Années Trente (French)
 Orientaliste description (French)
 Emmanuel Bréon and Michèle Lefrançois, Le musée des années 30, Editions Somogy, 2007. .

Museums in Hauts-de-Seine
Art museums and galleries in Île-de-France
Art museums established in 1939
1939 establishments in France